Kulänglarna ("The Bauble/Funny Angles") was the 1984 edition of Sveriges Radio's Christmas Calendar.

Plot
Julle runs a radio station with grammophone-rat Snurre Plätt  and musical Japanese Mrl Jingle inside a red cottage. Flying angel-reporter Helge is out asking experts questions about various topics.

Music
In 1984, Anders Berglund released music from the programme to LP and cassette on the Mariann label.

References

1984 radio programme debuts
1984 radio programme endings
Sveriges Radio's Christmas Calendar